Richard Warren "Rich" Olive (December 2, 1949 – June 20, 2016) was an American realtor and politician from Iowa. A Democrat, he served the Fifth District in the Iowa Senate from 2007 until 2011.

Olive served on several committees in the Iowa Senate: the Commerce committee; the Agriculture committee, where he was vice chair; the Economic Growth committee, where he was vice chair; and the Government Oversight committee, where he was chair.

Olive was elected in 2006 with 11,224 votes (50%), defeating Republican opponent James Kurtenbach. In his 2010 bid for re-election, he received 10,510 votes (45%), losing to Republican opponent Robert Bacon.

He attended South Dakota State University on scholarship for both football and basketball, but dropped out to serve in the Iowa National Guard. Olive lived and worked in Story City, where he ran Norsemen Realty. He married Marian Tesdall in 1971, with whom he had three daughters. On June 20, 2016, Olive died of cancer at the age of 66.

References

1949 births
2016 deaths
People from Bethesda, Maryland
People from Story City, Iowa
Businesspeople from Iowa
Democratic Party Iowa state senators
American Lutherans
Deaths from cancer in Iowa
American real estate brokers
South Dakota State Jackrabbits men's basketball players
South Dakota State Jackrabbits football players
National Guard (United States) officers
American men's basketball players
20th-century American businesspeople
20th-century Lutherans
Military personnel from Iowa